Otis is an unincorporated community in Lincoln County, Oregon, United States, a half mile north of Otis Junction on Oregon Route 18. It is near the Salmon River.

Otis post office was established in 1900 and was named after Otis Thompson, nephew of Archibald S. Thompson, the postmaster.

U.S. Route 101 used to pass through Otis until a curvy and hilly section of road was rerouted in the 1960s. Otis Junction is at the intersection of the former terminus of Oregon Route 18 and the former alignment of U.S. 101.

The Sitka Center for Art and Ecology has an Otis mailing address but is located nearer to the coast on Cascade Head. The Otis ZIP code, 97368, also covers the community of Rose Lodge. Today Otis and Otis Junction are considered synonymous.

Otis made the national headlines in 1999 and again in 2004, when it was announced that the town was for sale for $3 million. The news stories describe the Otis Café and other amenities that are at Otis Junction; it is unclear if the  that were for sale included the land in Otis proper. Owner Vivian Lematta's grandfather bought the land from descendants of the Siletz Indians for $800 in 1910. Lematta left Otis in 1957. Part of the land was used for raising cattle and part was undergoing timber conservation.

Climate
This region experiences warm (but not hot) and dry summers, with no average monthly temperatures above .  According to the Köppen Climate Classification system, Otis has a warm-summer Mediterranean climate, abbreviated "Csb" on climate maps.

References

External links
Historic images of Otis from Salem Public Library

Unincorporated communities in Lincoln County, Oregon
1900 establishments in Oregon
Populated places established in 1900
Unincorporated communities in Oregon